An authentication server provides a network service that applications use to authenticate the credentials, usually account names and passwords, of their users. When a client submits a valid set of credentials, it receives a cryptographic ticket that it can subsequently use to access various services.

Authentication is used as the basis for authorization, which is the determination whether a privilege may be granted to a particular user or process, privacy, which keeps information from becoming known to non-participants, and non-repudiation, which is the inability to deny having done something that was authorized to be done based on the authentication.

Major authentication algorithms include passwords, Kerberos, and public key encryption.

See also
 TACACS+
 RADIUS
 Multi-factor authentication
 Universal 2nd Factor

References

Computer network security
Servers (computing)